"First of the Year (Equinox)" is a song by American electronic music producer Skrillex. It was released on June 7, 2011, as the lead single from his third EP, More Monsters and Sprites. The song has since become a moderate commercial success, peaking within the charts of the United States, Australia, Canada, Norway and Sweden. A music video directed by Tony Truand, produced by HK Corp, premiered on August 10, 2011, and was nominated at the 54th Grammy Awards for Best Short Form Music Video. The music video was nominated for the MTV Video Music Award for Best Electronic Dance Music Video and it won the award for Best Visual Effects in a Video at 2012 MTV Video Music Awards.

Music video
The official music video for the song was made available for download on iTunes on August 10, 2011. The video was produced by French company HK Corp and directed by Tony Truand.  It was released on Skrillex's official YouTube channel on August 17, 2011, and has accumulated more than 420 million views.

The video focuses on a paedophile who follows a young, innocent-seeming girl as she skips down the street. As she descends into an underground area, he pulls out a cloth with chloroform. Just as he is about to attack, she screams "Call 911 now!" and begins utilizing telekinetic powers to manipulate the man's body. She raises him into the air and contorts his body into a variety of positions, slamming him against walls and shooting black smoke into and through his body. It is revealed that a dark figure, reminiscent of the slender figure in the Come to Daddy music video, is directly behind her making identical gestures to the child. The child's eyes turn the same color black as the figure. The suggestion is that the child is in fact some kind of avatar/golem being used by the creature to lure and punish child predators. Ultimately the child makes a final twisting motion with her hands, indicating she has killed the man. She is then shown using her finger to add a pitch black mark to a tally on the wall, adding another victim of her justice to the count (at least 75).

Critical reception 
Spin complimented the video, saying "It's one thing to empathize with at-risk kids, or to speak up for them generally, but Skrillex takes it a step further -- and then further still -- in this stunning new video for the track 'First of the Year (Equinox).'" And went on to say "But in this clip, the song's melodic preamble also serves as an ominous backdrop for a creepy, would-be predator who's lurking outside a playground where young children are frolicking. The day is overcast, but something much darker is in the air, as a little girl leaves and the man stalks after her. When she unexpectedly skips off to a dark, abandoned warehouse, he continues to follow, eventually entering a room where she's standing alone, holding a telephone receiver. The keyboards suddenly fade into a glitchier groove, and then, at the 1:25 mark, well, you gotta see for yourself."

The music video was nominated for Best Short Form Music Video at the 54th Grammy Awards. The video was nominated for the MTV Video Music Award for Best Electronic Dance Music Video and it won the award for Best Visual Effects in a Video at 2012 MTV Video Music Awards, awarded to VFX supervisors the Deka Brothers. The video is featured in "Werewolves of Highland", the first episode of season 8 of Beavis and Butt-head. The song is also used by Argentinian TV channel TV Pública to promote the matches of the 2012 Torneo Inicial.

Samples
First of the Year samples Equinox, an old demo track recorded by Skrillex (credited under his given name.) The vocal sample was pitch adjusted, reversed, sped-up, vocoded and rearranged, making it nearly indistinguishable. The song also samples a viral video from 2005, which features a woman screaming "Call 911 now", and was used without permission from the original author.

Charts

Weekly charts

Year-end charts

Certifications

References

2011 songs
2011 singles
Skrillex songs
Internet memes
Song recordings produced by Skrillex
Big Beat Records (American record label) singles
Songs written by Skrillex